The 2004–05 Purdue Boilermakers men's basketball team represented Purdue University during the 2004-05 NCAA Division I men's basketball season. Gene Keady served in his last year as head coach after a 25-year career at Purdue. The Boilermakers failed to beat a ranked team this season for the first time in Keady's time as head coach and for the first time since the 1974–75 season. Purdue placed 10th in the Big Ten, ahead of 11th place Penn State.

Schedule

References

Purdue
Purdue Boilermakers men's basketball seasons
Purd
Purd